Roland Young (11 November 1887 – 5 June 1953) was an English-born actor. He began his acting career on the London stage, but later found success in America and received an Academy Award nomination for his role in the film Topper (1937).

In 1960, Young was posthumously honored with two stars on the Hollywood Walk of Fame for his contributions in the television and motion pictures industries.

Early life
Born in London, England, Young was the son of an architect, and early indications were that he would pursue the father's career. He was educated at Sherborne School, Sherborne, Dorset and University College London before being accepted into the Royal Academy of Dramatic Art where his fellow classmate was Gordon Richards.

Career
Young made his first stage appearance in London's West End in Find the Woman in 1908, and in 1912 he made his Broadway debut in Hindle Wakes. He appeared in two comedies written for him by Clare Kummer, Good Gracious Annabelle! (1916) and A Successful Calamity (1917) before he served with the United States Army during World War I. He returned to New York when the war ended, and married Kummer's daughter Majorie in 1921 after they costarred in Kummer's Rollo's Wild Oat.  For the next few years, he alternated between New York and London. He made his film debut in the 1922 silent film Sherlock Holmes, in which he played Watson opposite John Barrymore as Holmes.

He signed a contract with Metro-Goldwyn-Mayer and made his talkie debut in The Unholy Night (1929), directed by Lionel Barrymore. He was loaned to Warner Bros. to appear in Her Private Life (also 1929), with Billie Dove and Fox Film Corporation, winning critical approval for his comedic performance as Jeanette MacDonald's husband in Don't Bet on Women (1931). He was again paired with MacDonald Annabelle's Affairs (1931), a talkie version of Good Gracious Annabelle!. He appeared in Cecil B. de Mille's The Squaw Man, and played opposite Alfred Lunt and Lynn Fontanne in The Guardsman (both 1931). He appeared with Evelyn Brent in Columbia's The Pagan Lady (also 1931) and Pola Negri in RKO's A Woman Commands (1932). His final film under his MGM contract was Lovers Courageous (1932), opposite Robert Montgomery. He had a starring role in a risqué comedy for Fox entitled Pleasure Cruise (1933) alongside Genevieve Tobin.

Freelance performer
Young began to work as a freelance performer and found himself in constant demand. He appeared with Jeanette MacDonald, Genevieve Tobin and Maurice Chevalier in One Hour With You (1932) and with Kay Francis in Street of Women (1932). Alexander Korda invited him to return to Britain to make his British film debut in Wedding Rehearsal (1932). He returned to Hollywood and appeared in a diverse group of films that included comedies, murder mysteries, and dramas, and also worked on Broadway. Among his films of this period were Ruggles of Red Gap (1935), David Copperfield (1935) (playing Uriah Heep), and the H.G. Wells fantasy The Man Who Could Work Miracles (1936).

In 1937, he achieved one of the most important successes of his career in Topper, as a bank president haunted by the ghosts of his clients, played by Cary Grant and Constance Bennett. It was one of the most successful films of the year, and Young was nominated for the Academy Award for Best Supporting Actor. Topper's wife was played by Billie Burke, who wrote in her memoir that Young "was dry and always fun to work with". They also appeared together in The Young in Heart (1938), and both of the Topper sequels, Topper Takes a Trip (1938) and Topper Returns (1941). He continued to play supporting roles in comedies such as Yes, My Darling Daughter, with Fay Bainter and Priscilla Lane, but over the next few years the importance of his roles again decreased. He achieved another success as Uncle Willie in The Philadelphia Story (1940) with Katharine Hepburn, Cary Grant and James Stewart. His last starring role was in the final instalment of the Topper series, Topper Returns in 1941, with Billie Burke, Joan Blondell and Carole Landis.

Later life and career
He continued working steadily through the 1940s, playing small roles opposite some of Hollywood's leading actresses, such as Joan Crawford, Marlene Dietrich, Paulette Goddard and Greta Garbo in her final film, Two-Faced Woman (1941). In 1945, he began his own radio show and appeared in the film adaption of Agatha Christie's And Then There Were None. By the end of the decade his film career had declined, and his final films, including The Great Lover (1949), in which he played a murderer opposite Bob Hope, and Fred Astaire's Let's Dance (1950), were not successful.

In the 1950s, Young appeared on several episodic television series, including Lux Video Theatre, Studio One, Pulitzer Prize Playhouse and The Chevrolet Tele-Theatre.

Recognition
Young has two stars on the Hollywood Walk of Fame, one for film at 6523 Hollywood Blvd. and another for television at 6315 Hollywood Blvd. Both were dedicated 8 February 1960.

Personal life
Young was married twice, to Marjorie Kummer from 1921 until 1940, and to Patience DuCroz from 1948 until his death at home in New York City at 65 in 1953.

Filmography

Partial list of stage appearances
 Hindle Wakes (1912)
 Good Gracious, Annabelle (1916)
 A Successful Calamity (1917)
 The Gipsy Trail (1917)
 Buddies (1919)
 Rollo's Wild Oat (1920)
 The Devil's Disciple (1923)
 Beggar on Horseback (1924)
 The Last of Mrs. Cheyney (1925)
 The Queen's Husband (1928)
 Her Master's Voice (1933)
 Another Love Story (1943)

See also
List of actors with Academy Award nominations

Bibliography
 Actors and Others (Pascal Covici, 1925)
 Not For Children: Pictures and Verse (Doubleday, Doran & Co., 1930)
 Thorne Smith: His Life and Times (Doubleday, Doran & Co., 1934)

References

Shipman, David, The Great Movie Stars, The Golden Years'', Bonanza Books, New York, 1970. Library of Congress Catalogue Card Number 78-133803

External links

Roland Young scrapbook and originals, 1905-1973, held by the Billy Rose Theatre Division, New York Public Library for the Performing Arts

1887 births
1953 deaths
English male film actors
English male silent film actors
English male radio actors
Male actors from London
English male stage actors
Alumni of University College London
Metro-Goldwyn-Mayer contract players
United States Army soldiers
English emigrants to the United States
British expatriate male actors in the United States
Male actors from New York (state)
20th-century English male actors
United States Army personnel of World War I